Middle Carter Mountain is a mountain located in Coos County, New Hampshire. The mountain is part of the Carter-Moriah Range of the White Mountains, which runs along the northern east side of Pinkham Notch.  Middle Carter is flanked to the north by North Carter Mountain and to the southwest by South Carter Mountain. The summit of Middle Carter is wooded, but there are views from the ridgecrest not far from the summit.

See also

 List of mountains in New Hampshire
 Four-thousand footers
 White Mountain National Forest

References

External links
 
 "Hiking Middle Carter Mountain". Appalachian Mountain Club.

Mountains of New Hampshire
Mountains of Coös County, New Hampshire
Mountains on the Appalachian Trail
New England Four-thousand footers